Veľké Trakany is a village and municipality in the Trebišov District in the Košice Region of south-eastern Slovakia.

History
In historical records the village was first mentioned in 1320.

Geography
The village lies at an altitude of 103 metres and covers an area of 10.68 km².
It has a population of about 1390 people.

Ethnicity
The village is about 83% Hungarian, 17% Slovak.

Facilities
The village has a public library a gym and a football pitch.

External links
https://web.archive.org/web/20070513023228/http://www.statistics.sk/mosmis/eng/run.html

Villages and municipalities in Trebišov District
Hungarian communities in Slovakia